Aletta Bezuidenhout (born 17 May 1949), is a Kenyan-born South African filmmaker, writer and actress. She is best known for her roles in productions: Weerskant die Nag, Committed and Spoon, Lament for Koos and Mother Courage.

Personal life
She was born on 17 May 1949 in Nairobi, Kenya. Her father was an engineer. She worked for the former Transvaal Council of the Performing Arts (Truk). She also trained and graduated with BA Drama at University of Cape Town.

She was married to musician Colin Shamley, then actor Tertius Meintjes and later to Anthony Perris.

Career
She studied drama at the University of Cape Town and later started her acting career at Kruik. Later, she moved to the old Transvaal and worked at The Company and the Market Theater. Meanwhile, she worked for numerous regional councils for the performing arts, such as 'Truk en Kruik'. Later she started to train other actors.

In 1970, she appeared in The Space and later involved with Dusa Stas Fish and Vi, The Resistible Rise of Arturo UI and Treats. In 1974, she founded the production company, 'The Company'. In the meantime, she contributed to the theater by acting in plays such as Desire, Mother Courage in 1977, Women of Troy, Lament for Koos and The Minotaur's Sister in 1985.

Apart from acting, she worked as a playwright and made Time of Footsteps, Silent Envelope, Angel in a Dark Room and Little Big World. In the television screen, she worked for the serials The Lady of the Camellias, Thicker than Water and Die Sonkring and Orion. Some of her popular films include: Djadje, Committed, On the Wire, Country of My Skull and Paljas.

Filmography

See also
 Fleur du Cap Theatre Awards

References

External links
 
 Film Experience

Living people
1949 births
Kenyan film actresses
People from Nairobi
21st-century South African actresses
20th-century South African actresses